Benoît Chassériau (also known as Benito Chassériau or Chasserieux; 19 August 1780 – 27 September 1844) was a French diplomat, French spy and Minister of the Interior of Cartagena, Colombia, comrade in arms of Simón Bolívar. He was the father of the artist Théodore Chassériau.

Biography
Chassériau came very early in the administration and made the memorable Egypt campaign. Although very young, he administered as Financial Controller, two important provinces of Upper Egypt from 1798 to 1801 under the command of general François-Étienne Damas and then under general Augustin-Daniel Belliard.

From 1802 until 1807, he was Treasurer-General and Secretary General of the French colony, Santo Domingo. Appointed Treasurer-General during the expedition to Santo Domingo in 1802, Chassériau held the position of Secretary General in the government of general Jean-Louis Ferrand in the eastern part of Santo Domingo, ceded to France by the Treaty of Basel. During the invasion of the peninsula by the imperial armies, this part of the territory of Santo Domingo, remained more Spanish than French. Taken prisoner, Chassériau managed to escape but maritime war prevented him from returning to France. He visited the West Indies and the mainland of Spanish America. Chassériau was one of the French exiles at the origin of the city of Aigleville and the Vine and Olive Colony.

In 1813 Simón Bolívar appointed Chassériau Minister of the Interior and the Police in Cartagena, Colombia with his friend Antoine Leleux, who had the portfolio of War.

Chassériau as commander took a very active part in the first expedition led by independent against Portobelo (Panama) and Santa Marta. He left Cartagena with 460 men on board 8 schooners and attacked Portobelo (Panama) on 16 January 1814. This expedition was a failure and was rejected by the Spanish royalists controlled by governor Joaquín Rodríguez Valcárcel. The second expedition conducted in 1819 by Scottish general Gregor MacGregor was a success.

In 1822, Chassériau was the representative of the Masonic loge of the Guajira to the Grand Orient of France. Belonging to a lodge was more a sign of adherence to philosophical or religious principles in a revolutionary goal for freedom and against Spain.

Returned to France in 1822, François-René de Chateaubriand, then Minister of Foreign Affairs, sent him on a foreign posting from 1823 until 1824. Chateaubriand gave two informal postings to Chassériau: the first mission was to ensure the mediation of France between Spain and the new state and the second mission to facilitate trade relations between Colombia and the French Caribbean colonies, mainly Martinique.

From 1826 to 1830, Chassériau was employed by the Department of the Navy as agent in the Danish island of Saint Thomas, U.S. Virgin Islands. From 1832 to 1833 he was employed by the Department of Foreign Affairs, as a Consul of France in St. Thomas. He was Honorary Consul accredited in Puerto Rico from 1835 to 1839, and served from 1840 to 1844 as Consul of France in Puerto Rico, which had a population of 450,000 – of which 12,000 were French.

Chassériau died in Puerto Rico on 27 September 1844.

The French friend of Simón Bolívar
Chassériau maintained for many years a friendly relationship with Simón Bolívar who in his correspondence called him "my French friend".

In 1815, Chassériau indirectly saved the life of Bolívar in Kingston. 
On 10 December 1815 a few hours before the assassination attempt, Chassériau visited Bolivar and gave him money to seek alternative accommodation. Thus, the Liberator left the room where José Antonio Páez had slept for several nights and depended on the guesthouse Rafael Pisce at the corner of Prince and White streets. The same night, Pio the servant of Bolivar and Paez plunged a knife into the neck of Captain Felix Amestoy, thinking it was the Liberator.

In 1816, Chassériau helped finance Simón Bolívar expedition to los Cayos in the southwestern part of Haiti.
To collect 3,000 pesos, Chassériau formed a consortium with Jean Pavageau, Michael Scott, George Robertson, S. Campbell and Maxwell Hyslop. On his part, Chassériau lent the sum of 404 pesos to Simón Bolívar. To express his gratitude, Bolivar asked in 1827 the repayment of the loan by increasing interest at 6% per annum from 1 January 1816.

Family
Chassériau was the last of 18 children of Jean Chassériau, merchant, ship owner, advisor to the City of La Rochelle. He married in 1806, Marie Madeleine Couret de la Blaquière, daughter of a wealthy French owner in Santo Domingo.
He was the father of five children:
 Frederic-Charles Victor Chassériau (1807–1881), State Councilor and historian of the Navy 
 the Romantic painter Théodore Chassériau (1819–1856)
 Adèle, Aline Chassériau and Ernest

Distinctions
 Knight of the Legion of Honor 
 Knight of the Royal Order of Dannebrog 
 Knight of Isabella the Catholic
 Member of the Société royale des antiquaires du Nord, in Copenhagen

Bibliography 
 Conference "Benoît Chassériau, náufrago de Saint-Domingue, revolucionario en la Tierra Firme y agente de la Francia de la Restauración" by Daniel Gutiérrez Ardila and Efrain Gonzalo Sanchez, 12 September 2019, Luis Ángel Arango Library, Bogota (Colombia) – Conferences for the celebration of the bi-centenary of Colombia organized by the Bank of the Republic (Colombia)
 Jean-Baptiste Nouvion, "Une autre 'affaire de Panama' ou le projet de conquête de quatre Français en 1820" (Louis-Michel Aury, Benoît Chassériau, Jean Pavageau and Jean-Baptiste de Novion), Revue d'histoire diplomatique, Paris, Éditions A. Pedone, no 2, 2019
 Jean-Baptiste Nouvion, Patrick Puigmal (postface), "L'ami des Colombiens, Benoît Chassériau (1780–1844)", LAC Editions, Paris, 2018
 Patrick Puigmal, "Diccionario de los militares napoleónicos durante la Independencia de los países bolivarianos : (Colombia, Venezuela, Bolivia, Ecuador) / compilación e investigación", Centre de Recherches Diego Barros Arana de la Bibliothèque Nationale de Santiago (DIBAM), Chile, 2015
 Daniel Gutiérrez Ardila, Benoît Chassériau en Colombie in "Les commissaires de la Restauration auprès des Etats hispano-américains (1818–1826)", Cahiers de l’Institut d’histoire de la Révolution française, Paris – 2014
 William Spence Robertson, "France and Latin-American independence" (Chassériau mission in Colombia commissioned by the viscount of Chateaubriand), The Johns Hopkins Press, Baltimore – 1939
 Jean-Louis Vaudoyer, "L’histoire de Benoit Chassériau, consul de France à Puerto Rico", Conférence du 17 juin 1935 à l'assemblée générale de la Société des amis du Louvre, Paris – 1935

External links
 Direction des archives du ministère des Affaires étrangères – Dossier individuel  pour Benoît Chassériau
 Conferences for the celebration of the bi-centenary of Colombia organized by the Bank of the Republic (Colombia): "Benoît Chassériau, náufrago de Saint-Domingue, revolucionario en la Tierra Firme y agente de la Francia de la Restauración" 12 September 2019 (https://www.banrepcultural.org/proyectos/bicentenario-de-una-nacion-en-el-mundo/conferencias)

Sources
Archives of the French Ministry of Foreign Affairs – individual file n° 889 Benoît Chassériau

References

French diplomats
1780 births
1844 deaths
Colombian people of French descent
Dominican Republic people of French descent
Puerto Rican people of French descent
People of the Colombian War of Independence
Colombian Ministers of the Interior
People of Spanish Texas
People from La Rochelle
Benoit